John Stone (born ) is a Welsh curler and curling coach.

He was a longtime member of the Welsh national men's curling team in the 1980s and 1990s.

Teams

Record as a coach of national teams

References

External links

Welsh Curling: A History | Welsh Curling Association

Living people
1934 births
Welsh male curlers
Welsh curling coaches
Place of birth missing (living people)